Calliostoma osbornei, common name Osborn's top shell, is a species of medium-sized sea snail, a marine gastropod mollusc in the family Calliostomatidae, the calliostoma top snails.

Description
The size of the shell varies between 25 mm and 35 mm.

Distribution
This marine species occurs off New Zealand.

References

 Marshall, 1995. A revision of the recent Calliostoma species of New Zealand (Mollusca:Gastropoda:Trochoidea). The Nautilus 108(4):83-127

External links

Further reading 
 Powell A. W. B., New Zealand Mollusca, William Collins Publishers Ltd, Auckland, New Zealand 1979 

osbornei
Gastropods of New Zealand
Gastropods described in 1926